Hengqin is an island in Zhuhai, a prefecture-level city and special economic zone in Guangdong Province of the People's Republic of China. It has a population of about 3,000. Parts of Hengqin were leased to Macau by the State Council of the People's Republic of China starting in 2009, with the area expanding. In the leased parts of the island, Macau law applies.

The whole island is designated a special economic district, as Hengqin New Area, similar to Binhai New Area in Tianjin and Pudong New Area in Shanghai.

Geography 

Hengqin Island is adjacent to the Taipa and Coloane districts of Macau, with the Shisanmen Waterway separating them, and is connected to Macau's Cotai via the Lotus Bridge. The island is the largest among the 146 islands of Zhuhai, being roughly three times the size of Macau. It has broad bays, sandy beaches, strangely shaped jagged rocks, scenery, and natural vegetation cover.

Hengqin was formerly made up of two islands, Xiaohengqin and Dahengqin, which were recently connected as a result of land reclamation. The reclaimed island is  large.

History 

Portugal claimed both Xiao Hengqin and Da Hengqin, along with the larger former island of Wanzai (Portuguese: Lapa) — now a peninsula — to their north, as part of the Província da Macau, because "Portuguese schools are established there". In 1896, Portuguese determined to occupy the two islands of Hengqin, but did not succeed in doing so. Portugal briefly occupied them before World War II.

Since the land reclamation and development, there has been a growing opinion in Macau that the island should be leased to Macau, which has very limited land and little room for further development. By 1 September 2005, plans were revealed that the government of Guangdong will allow tax exemptions and adopt flexible immigration control in Hengqin to promote investment from Hong Kong and Macau.

On 27 June 2009 the government of Macau officially announced that the University of Macau would build its new campus on 1 km2 of the island, in a stretch directly facing the Cotai area, south of the current border post. This would be the first of other possible projects. Construction of the campus would take three years and would include an underwater tunnel. The Standing Committee of the National People's Congress officially adopted a decision authorising Macau to exercise jurisdiction over the new campus on its opening. Macau law would apply in the university campus and it would not be necessary to pass a formal border post. The Macau Special Administrative Region will pay an amount of rent – which has not yet been set – for the use of the land.

In early 2013 the Macau Legislative Assembly passed Law 3/2013 providing for the application of Macau Law in the campus effective on opening day. In 2020 the Macau Legislative Assembly passed Law 1/2020 providing for the application of Macau Law in a part of Hengqin Port. Macau's juridisction over this area became effective on 18 March.

Tourism 

With Hengqin island, the goal of the authorities is to create a combined Las Vegas and Orlando for Asia, with an expansive casino offering in Macau, and at the same time non-gaming leisure and tourist activities.

In late 2005, Las Vegas Sands openly discussed its multibillion-dollar plan to develop parts of Hengqin Island into a convention and resort destination. The project was to include four million sq ft of convention space, hotels, retail, vacation homes, and golf, tennis and yachting amenities.

On 29 November 2010, the main body of the Chime-Long International Ocean Resort (with an initial investment of 10 billion yuan) kicked off the construction on Hengqin Island and was originally expected to become operational in 2013.

The Chimelong Ocean Kingdom, consisting of entertainment facilities, amusement rides, performances, high-tech experiences and animal watching as well as the dolphin-themed hotel with 1,888 guest rooms was opened in 2014, and has been the 11th most visited theme park in the world in 2017.

The Hengqin International Tennis Center opened in September 2015. It currently hosts three international competitions: the WTA Elite Trophy, the Zhuhai Open and the Asia-Pacific Wildcard Playoff for the Australian Open.

Subdistricts of Hengqin New Area

 Northwestern Zone – reserved for environmentally friendly development projects
 Northern Zone – A Bridge and main entrance between Central Zhuhai and Hengqin New Area
 Northeastern Exhibition Zone – development of an exhibition center and hotels
 Central Channel – develop as a leisure and recreational theme park
 Eastern Residential and Commercial Zone – co-development of the PRC and Macau's projects such as University of Macau's new campus
 Eastern Residential and Commercial Zone – Macau Cotai-Lotus bridge-Hengqin port
 Eastern Residential and Commercial Zone – Hengqin railway station
 Eastern Residential and Commercial Zone – Hengqin hospital
 Southern Tourist Zone – A future tourism attraction which is further divided into seven sub-zones
 Theme Park Area
 Seaside Hotel Area
 Natural Tourist Area
 Scenic Area
 Water Activities Area
 Seaside Holiday Resort Area
 Golf Course Holiday Resort Area
 Hengqin Bridge

References

External links

Hengqin New Area official website
Edmonds, Richard Louis, "Macau in the Pearl River Delta and Beyond", China Perspectives, no. 44, November–December 2002
Satellite image by Google Maps

Islands of Zhuhai
Islands of the South China Sea
Economy of Macau
Islands of Macau
History of Macau
Former Portuguese colonies
Geography of Zhuhai
Towns in Guangdong
Islands of Guangdong
Islands of China